Ango Ango is a town in the Bas-Congo province of the Democratic Republic of the Congo.

Transport 

It is the terminus of a branch line of the national railway system.

See also 

 Railway stations in DRCongo

References 

Populated places in Kongo Central